Mt. Hood Community College (MHCC) is a public community college in Gresham, Oregon, United States, named after Mount Hood. Opened in 1966, MHCC enrolls around 30,000 students each year and offers classes at the  main campus in Gresham, as well as the Maywood Park Center in Portland, the Bruning Center for Allied Health Education (also in Gresham), and at area public schools.

The college's sports teams, the Saints, compete in the Northwest Athletic Conference. The college also owns and oversees KMHD, a non-profit FM broadcast radio station based in Portland.

Campus 
The main campus occupies  in Gresham. Other facilities include the Maywood Park campus in Portland, the Bruning Center for Allied Health Education and area public schools.

Academics 
MHCC enrolls roughly 30,000 students each year and is accredited by the Northwest Commission on Colleges and Universities. The college's programs include nursing, funeral science, integrated media, automotive technology and transfer opportunities to local universities toward B.A. degrees in humanities and science programs.

The college is financed by local property tax funds, state reimbursement funds and student tuition. Local voters established the college tax base in 1968 and approved tax base increases in 1970 and 1980.

MHCC is home to an Eastern Oregon University 4-year degree program in either Business Administration or Education, both with several concentrations. The classes are held in the same manner as a regular 4-year institution, under the Eastern Oregon University - Mt. Hood Metro Center.

Student life 
The college has historically been known for its jazz performance program, and was the home of jazz radio station KMHD and was the site of the Mt. Hood Jazz Festival each summer from 1982 through 2002 and from 2008 through 2010. The college has an active student government, almost 30 student clubs, and a student newspaper, The Advocate.

The college also annually hosts the Portland Highland Games.

Athletics 
Mt. Hood Community College competes in the Northwest Athletic Conference (NWAC). The college nickname is the Saints in reference to the St. Bernard mascot. There are four men's teams including baseball, basketball, track and field, and cross country. There are five women's teams including volleyball, softball, basketball, track and field, and cross country.

The college features a large aquatics center, which includes an indoor swimming pool.

Notable people

Alumni
Chris Botti, Grammy Award-winning trumpeter
Brian Burres, Major League Baseball pitcher
Dan Carlson, Major League Baseball pitcher
Marco Eneidi, free jazz saxophonist 
Essiet Essiet, jazz bassist 
Todd Field, Academy Award-nominated filmmaker
Nick Kahl, politician
Stafford Mays, NFL player
Joel David Moore, actor and director
Lillian Pitt, Native American artist
Patti Smith, politician
Dave Veres, Major League Baseball pitcher
Lindsay Wagner, actress
Paul Wenner, creator of the Gardenburger vegetarian patty

Presidents
1966–1976: Dr. Earl Klapstein
1976–1985: Dr. R. Stephen Nicholson
1985–1996: Dr. Paul E. Kreider
1996–2000: Dr. Joel E. Vela
2001–2007: Dr. Robert Silverman
2008–2011: Dr. John J. "Ski" Sygielski
2011-2013: Dr. Michael Hay
2013-2018: Dr. Debra Derr
since 2018: Dr. Lisa Skari

See also 
 List of Oregon community colleges

References

Further reading

External links 

 Official website

 
1966 establishments in Oregon
Buildings and structures in Gresham, Oregon
Education in Multnomah County, Oregon
Education in Gresham, Oregon
Educational institutions established in 1966
Community colleges in Oregon
Universities and colleges accredited by the Northwest Commission on Colleges and Universities